Ellen Eliza Knight Peck (born  1830s – after 1925?) was a "notorious" American criminal sometimes called "Confidence Queen."

When she was arrested in 1908 in New York City supposedly at the age of 70, the New York Times called her the "Confidence Queen" and said she had been "arrested many times."

Described by Thomas F. Byrnes as a "dangerous confidence woman" in Professional Criminals of America in 1886, she was estimated to be about 50 years old.

In 1897 she was in the Tombs for an alleged theft of jewelry.

She was pardoned by New York Governor Dix and released from prison in 1911 at age 82 (allegedly) on account of being "too old" to be a menace to society.

References

External links
 Descendants of Sarah Parker Mother of Mrs. Ellen E. Peck "Queen of the Confidence Women"

20th-century American criminals
19th-century American criminals
American confidence tricksters